William Waters Boyce (October 24, 1818 – February 3, 1890) was a slave owner, attorney, South Carolina state politician, and a U.S. Congressman. He was also a prominent Confederate States of America politician during the American Civil War.

Early life and education
Boyce was born in Charleston, South Carolina and attended South Carolina College (now the University of South Carolina) and the University of Virginia. He was admitted to the bar in 1839.

Career 
Boyce served in the state House of Representatives from 1846–47. He represented South Carolina in the United States House of Representatives from 1853–60.

He was a representative from South Carolina in the Provisional Confederate Congress, the First Confederate Congress and the Second Confederate Congress from 1861–65. From his position on the C.S. House Committee on Naval Affairs, he was known as partisan of "the coalition against Jeff Davis." He resumed his law practice after the war.

References 

1818 births
1890 deaths
19th-century American politicians
Democratic Party members of the United States House of Representatives from South Carolina
Deputies and delegates to the Provisional Congress of the Confederate States
Lawyers from Charleston, South Carolina
Members of the Confederate House of Representatives from South Carolina
Politicians from Charleston, South Carolina
Signers of the Confederate States Constitution
Signers of the Provisional Constitution of the Confederate States
People of South Carolina in the American Civil War
University of South Carolina alumni
19th-century American lawyers